Lu Lin (born 3 February 1985) is a Chinese football player who plays as a left winger.

Club career
Lu Lin was the product of the Guangzhou Pharmaceutical youth team and would soon be sent off to their satellite youth team Xiangxue Pharmaceutical to play within the 2002–03 Hong Kong First Division League before he broke into the Guangzhou senior team during the 2003 Chinese league season. With his good technical ability and awareness he would also break into the Chinese U-20 football team and play in the 2005 FIFA World Youth Championship. Upon his return he would go on to establish himself as a regular with Guangzhou and was part of the team that won the 2007 China League One division and promotion to the 2008 Chinese Super League.

Within the top tier Lu would help establish Guangzhou as mid-table regulars until the club was found guilty of match-fixing in 2006 and were punished with relegation at the end of the 2009 Chinese Super League season. Despite this Lu would remain faithful towards the club and was part of the team that went on to immediately win promotion back into the top tier at the end of the 2010 league season. Lu would, however decide to move to second tier club Guangdong Sunray Cave on a free transfer in February 2011 to gain more playing time. On 13 July, Lu Lin scored Guangdong's second goal in a friendly against Liverpool in a 4-3 loss.

Lu signed a three-year-contract with Guangzhou R&F in December 2011 and would go on to represent them on more than 100 occasions. Lu is from Guangzhou and during his long career has only played professional football for Guangzhou-based teams which, combined with his displays on the pitch, makes him a favourite of the fans. This was confirmed on 8 May 2016 when Lu played his 300th competitive game for a professional team based in Guangzhou. He extended his contract with the club until the end of 2018 on 7 November 2016. On 26 April 2018, he extended his contract for another two years until the end of 2020 season.

On 4 February 2021, Lu joined second tier club Meizhou Hakka on a free transfer. He would go on to make his debut for the team in a league game on 25 April 2021 against Xinjiang Tianshan Leopard in a 2-1 victory. He would go on to establish himself as a vital member of the team that gained promotion to the top tier after coming second within the division at the end of the 2021 China League One campaign.

International career
He would rise to prominence when he was called up to the Chinese U-20 football team in the 2005 FIFA World Youth Championship in the Netherlands and scoring a free kick in the 4-1 win over Panama in the group stage.

Lu Lin has also represented Guangdong Province in the annual Guangdong-Hong Kong Cup, including in 2014 when his two goals helped Guangdong to victory.

Career statistics
Statistics accurate as of match played 16 December 2022.

Honours

Club
Guangzhou F.C.
 China League One: 2007, 2010

Individual 

 Guangdong's 'Mr Football': 2016, 2017, 2018

References

External links
Player profile at sohu.com (Chinese)
Player profile at sina.com (Chinese)
 

1985 births
Living people
Chinese footballers
Footballers from Guangzhou
Hong Kong First Division League players
Chinese Super League players
China League One players
Guangzhou F.C. players
Guangdong Sunray Cave players
Guangzhou City F.C. players
Association football midfielders